The 2022 Toyota 200 presented by CK Power was the eleventh stock car race of the 2022 NASCAR Camping World Truck Series and the 22nd iteration of the event. The race was held on Saturday, June 4, 2022, in Madison, Illinois at World Wide Technology Raceway, a  permanent quad-oval racetrack. The race was increased from 160 laps to 165 laps, due to a NASCAR overtime finish. Corey Heim, driving for Kyle Busch Motorsports, would take advantage of the lead on the final restart, and win the race after the caution came out on the last lap. This was Heim's second career NASCAR Camping World Truck Series win, and his second of the season. To fill out the podium, Christian Eckes of ThorSport Racing and Chandler Smith of Kyle Busch Motorsports would finish 2nd and 3rd, respectively.

Three drivers made their debut in this race: Rajah Caruth, Mason Maggio, and Jake Garcia. Justin Carroll was scheduled to make his debut as well, but would fail to qualify.

Background 
World Wide Technology Raceway (formerly Gateway International Raceway and Gateway Motorsports Park) is a motorsport racing facility in Madison, Illinois, just east of St. Louis, Missouri, United States, close to the Gateway Arch. It features a  oval that hosts the NASCAR Cup Series, NASCAR Camping World Truck Series, and the NTT IndyCar Series, a  infield road course used by the SCCA, Porsche Club of America, and various car clubs, and a quarter-mile drag strip that hosts the annual NHRA Midwest Nationals event.

Entry list 

 (R) denotes rookie driver.
 (i) denotes driver who are ineligible for series driver points.

Practice 
The only 30-minute practice session was held on Friday, June 3, at 5:00 PM CST.

Qualifying 
Qualifying was held on Friday, June 3, at 5:30 PM CST. Since World Wide Technology Raceway is an oval track, the qualifying system used is a single-car, one-lap system with only one round. Whoever sets the fastest time in the round wins the pole.

Race results 
Stage 1 Laps: 55

Stage 2 Laps: 55

Stage 3 Laps: 55

Standings after the race 

Drivers' Championship standings

Note: Only the first 10 positions are included for the driver standings.

References 

2022 NASCAR Camping World Truck Series
NASCAR races at Gateway Motorsports Park
Toyota 200
2022 in sports in Illinois